An eel is a fish in the order of Anguilliformes.

Eel or eels may also refer to:

Animals

Amphibians
 Congo eel, amphibians of the genus Amphiuma (order Caudata)
 Siren intermedia or two-legged eel and/or mud eel
 Rubber eel, an aquatic caecilian of the family Typhlonectidae (order Gymnophiona)

Ray-finned fish 
 Electric eel, a species of knifefish in the order of Gymnotiformes
 Deep-sea spiny eels, a common name for fish in the family Notacanthidae, order Notacanthiformes
 Fire eel
 Spiny eel
 Swamp eel

People
 Camille Henry (1933-1997), Canadian National Hockey League player nicknamed "The Eel"
 Eric Moussambani (born 1978), Equatorial Guinean swimmer nicknamed "Eric the Eel"

Places
 Eel Glacier, Washington state, United States
 Eel Lake, Oregon, United States
 Eels Lake, Ontario, Canada
 Eel River (disambiguation)
 Eel Township, Cass County, Indiana, United States
 Crag Hill, Lake District, UK, a mountain formerly known as Eel Crag

Arts and entertainment
 Eels (band), a musical group
 "Eels" (The Mighty Boosh), a 2007 episode of The Mighty Boosh
 The Eel (film), a 1997 Japanese film
 USS Eel, a fictional submarine in the novel Run Silent, Run Deep and its film adaptation

Fictional characters
 Eel (comics), two Marvel Comics villains
 Eel (G.I. Joe), a set of fictional characters in the G.I. Joe universe
 The Eel (fictional character), a pulp fiction character
 Eel O'Brien, real name of Plastic Man, a comic book superhero

Other uses
 Eel as food
 Electron energy loss spectroscopy
 Entwicklung und Erprobung von Leichtflugzeugen, a German aircraft design concern based in Putzbrunn
 Environmentally Endangered Lands, a wildland conservation program in Brevard County, Florida
 Extensible Embeddable Language, a scripting and programming language
 Parramatta Eels, an Australian rugby league club
 USS Eel (SS-354), a projected United States Navy submarine
Elastic potential energy, sometimes abbreviated as "eel" in Physics

See also
 EAL (disambiguation)
 Eeles, a name